Vitalii Igorevich Abramov (born May 8, 1998) is a Russian professional ice hockey forward. He is a member of HC CSKA Moscow of the Kontinental Hockey League (KHL). Abramov has played five games in the National Hockey League with the Ottawa Senators. Abramov was selected 65th overall by the Columbus Blue Jackets in the 2016 NHL Entry Draft and later traded to Ottawa.

Playing career
In his rookie season with the Gatineau Olympiques, the 2015–16 season, Abramov recorded 93 points in 63 games. He was awarded the RDS Cup as QMJHL Rookie of the Year and the Michel Bergeron Trophy as Offensive Rookie of the Year. He was also named to the All-Rookie Team. Leading up to the 2016 NHL Entry Draft, Abramov was ranked 29th overall for North American skaters by the NHL Central Scouting Bureau. He was eventually drafted 65th overall by the Columbus Blue Jackets.

On December 24, 2016, Abramov was signed to a three-year, entry-level contract with the Columbus Blue Jackets. After recording 104 points in 66 games, Abramov was awarded the Jean Béliveau Trophy as the top regular season scorer of the 2016–17 season. He was also awarded the Michel Brière Memorial Trophy as MVP of the QMJHL and named to the First All-Star Team. On April 7, 2017, Abramov began his professional career when he was assigned to the Blue Jackets American Hockey League affiliate, the Cleveland Monsters.

The following season, Abramov returned to the Olympiques in the QMJHL. On November 17, Abramov was traded to the Victoriaville Tigres along with a 2018 6th round QMJHL draft pick in exchange for four future draft picks. He still found success with his new team and was named to the Second All-Star Team after recording 78 points in 40 games.

Abramov attended the Blue Jackets 2018–19 training camp but failed to make their final roster and was assigned to the AHL to join the Cleveland Monsters. Abramov posted 12 goals and 22 points in 52 games with the Monsters before he was traded by the Blue Jackets, along with Jonathan Davidsson and two conditional first-round picks to the Ottawa Senators in exchange for Matt Duchene and Julius Bergman on February 22, 2019. He scored his first NHL goal on October 10, 2019 against the St. Louis Blues.

As an impending restricted free agent from the Senators, Abramov opted to pause his North American career by agreeing to a two-year contract with Russian club, Traktor Chelyabinsk of the KHL, on 26 May 2021. In the 2021–22 season, Abramov made 41 appearances with his hometown club, Traktor, posting 8 goals and 17 points through the mid-point of the campaign. On 27 December 2021, Abramov was traded by Chelyabinsk to HC CSKA Moscow in exchange for Artyom Blazhiyevsky.

Career statistics

Regular season and playoffs

International

Awards and honours

References

External links

1998 births
Living people
Belleville Senators players
Belye Medvedi Chelyabinsk players
Cleveland Monsters players
Columbus Blue Jackets draft picks
HC CSKA Moscow players
Gatineau Olympiques players
Mikkelin Jukurit players
Ottawa Senators players
Russian ice hockey right wingers
Sportspeople from Chelyabinsk
Traktor Chelyabinsk players
Victoriaville Tigres players